Serine/threonine-protein kinase tousled-like 1 is an enzyme that in humans is encoded by the TLK1 gene.

Function 

The Tousled-like kinases, first described in Arabidopsis, are nuclear serine/threonine kinases that are potentially involved in the regulation of chromatin assembly.[supplied by OMIM]

Interactions 

TLK1 has been shown to interact with ASF1B, ASF1A and TLK2.

References

Further reading